Vladimir Nikolayevich Bluzhin (born 22 March 1969) is a former Russian professional footballer.

Club career
He made his professional debut in the Soviet Second League in 1987 for FC Uralets Nizhny Tagil. He played four games in the UEFA Intertoto Cup 1996 for FC Uralmash Yekaterinburg.

Personal life
His son Vyacheslav Bluzhin also played football professionally.

References

1969 births
People from Nizhny Tagil
Living people
Soviet footballers
Russian footballers
Association football defenders
Russian Premier League players
FC Ural Yekaterinburg players
Russian expatriate footballers
Expatriate footballers in Hungary
FC Arsenal Tula players
FC Iskra Smolensk players
FC Uralets Nizhny Tagil players
Sportspeople from Sverdlovsk Oblast